Ozernoye is a rural locality (a selo) and the administrative center of Ozernensky Selsoviet of Seryshevsky District, Amur Oblast, Russia. The population was 560 as of 2018. There are 11 streets.

Geography 
Ozernoye is located 23 km north of Seryshevo (the district's administrative centre) by road. Arga is the nearest rural locality.

References 

Rural localities in Seryshevsky District